Swing Around Rosie is a 1959 studio album by Rosemary Clooney, accompanied by the Buddy Cole trio.

Track listing
 "'Deed I Do" (Walter Hirsch, Fred Rose) – 1:49
 "You Took Advantage of Me" (Lorenz Hart, Richard Rodgers) – 2:24
 "Blue Moon" (Hart, Rodgers) – 2:27
 "Sing, You Sinners" (Sam Coslow, W. Franke Harling) – 2:16
 "A Touch of the Blues" (Don George, Eddie Wilcox) – 2:43
 "Goody Goody" (Matty Malneck, Johnny Mercer) – 2:07
 "Too Close for Comfort" (Jerry Bock, Larry Holofcener, George David Weiss) – 2:39
 "Do Nothin' Till You Hear from Me" (Duke Ellington, Bob Russell) – 2:49
 "Moonlight Mississippi (A Whistle Stop Town)" (Willard Robison) – 2:36
 "I Wish I Were in Love Again" (Hart, Rodgers) – 2:23
 "Sunday in Savannah" (Hugh Mackay) – 2:31
 "This Can't Be Love" (Hart, Rodgers) – 2:06

Personnel

Performance
 Rosemary Clooney – vocal
 The Buddy Cole trio

References

1959 albums
Rosemary Clooney albums
Coral Records albums